The Asia Minor thin-toed gecko (Mediodactylus heterocercus) is a species of lizard in the family Gekkonidae. It is found in Iran, southeastern Turkey, southern Iraq, and Syria.

References

Mediodactylus
Reptiles described in 1874